Pachitea can refer to:

 Pachitea Province, a province in the Huánuco Region in Peru
 Pachitea River, a river in Peru
 Pachitea, a genus of insects in the tribe Cicadellini